Sharof Rashidovich Rashidov (Uzbek Cyrillic: Шароф Рашидович Рашидов; ;  – 31 October 1983) was a Communist Party leader in the Uzbek SSR and a CPSU Central Committee Politburo candidate member between 1961 and 1983.

Biography 
Born the day before the Russian Revolution to a poor peasant family in Jizzakh, Uzbekistan, Sharof Rashidov worked as a teacher, journalist and editor for a Samarkand newspaper. He returned home in 1942 with wounds suffered on the German front in World War II. He became head of the Uzbekistan Writers Union in 1949, and was elected to the post of Chairman of the Presidium of the Uzbek Supreme Soviet in 1950. In 1959, he became First Secretary of the Uzbek Communist Party, a post he held to his death in 1983.

In the Soviet Union his name became synonymous with corruption, nepotism and the Uzbek cotton scandal of the Era of Stagnation. With orders from Moscow to grow increasing quantities of cotton, the Uzbek government responded by reporting miraculous growth in land irrigated and harvested, and record improvements in production and efficiency. The Uzbek leadership used these exaggerated figures to transfer substantial amounts of wealth from central Soviet funds into Uzbekistan. 

Rashidov died on 31 October 1983 in Ellikqala District, Karakalpak ASSR, Uzbek SSR. Immediately after his death, rumors spread that he had realized he was about to be disgraced and thus committed suicide. However, this has never been confirmed.

Legacy

After Uzbekistan's independence, Rashidov's image was rehabilitated by Uzbek President Islam Karimov as a symbol of national strength against detrimental Soviet central planning.

Personal life
His daughter Gulnara married Uzbek statesman and diplomat Abdulaziz Kamilov. His granddaughter Sayyora Rashidova was a chemist who was a member of the Oliy Majlis.

See also
 The Pyramid. The Soviet Mafia

References

1917 births
1983 deaths
People from Jizzakh
Soviet military personnel of World War II
Soviet journalists
Soviet newspaper editors
Heroes of Socialist Labour
Party leaders of the Soviet Union
Soviet politicians who committed suicide
Politburo of the Central Committee of the Communist Party of the Soviet Union candidate members
Central Committee of the Communist Party of the Soviet Union members
First Secretaries of the Communist Party of Uzbekistan
Recipients of the Order of Lenin
Recipients of the Order of the Red Star
Third convocation members of the Supreme Soviet of the Soviet Union
Fourth convocation members of the Supreme Soviet of the Soviet Union
Fifth convocation members of the Supreme Soviet of the Soviet Union
Sixth convocation members of the Supreme Soviet of the Soviet Union
Seventh convocation members of the Supreme Soviet of the Soviet Union
Eighth convocation members of the Supreme Soviet of the Soviet Union
Ninth convocation members of the Supreme Soviet of the Soviet Union
Tenth convocation members of the Supreme Soviet of the Soviet Union
20th-century Russian journalists